Kathrin U. Jansen (born 1958) is the former Head of Vaccine Research and Development at Pfizer. She previously led the development of the HPV vaccine (Gardasil) and newer versions of the pneumococcal conjugate vaccine (Prevnar), and is working with BioNTech to create a COVID-19 vaccine using mRNA (Pfizer–Biotech COVID-19 vaccine) that was approved for Emergency Use Authorization in the United States on December 11, 2020.

Early life and education 
Jansen was born in Erfurt, East Germany. She was frequently unwell as a child, and suffered several throat infections. The medical treatment she received from her father (antibiotics, codeine) inspired her to pursue a career in drug development. Her family fled to West Germany before the Berlin Wall was constructed in 1961. To transport Jansen across the border, her aunt pretended that she was her child, giving her some sleeping pills so that she didn't wake up and tell the border patrol the truth. Her family settled in Marl, North Rhine-Westphalia. She eventually studied biology at the University of Marburg, with the hope to work in the pharmaceutical industry. Whilst she was an undergraduate, Rudolf K. Thauer arrived at the university, and established a department of microbiology. Jansen completed her doctoral degree at the University of Marburg, where she studied chemical pathways in bacteria. After earning her degree, Jansen moved to Cornell University as an Alexander von Humboldt Foundation postdoctoral fellow investigating the function of the acetylcholine receptor with George Paul Hess. In particular, Jansen focussed on the yeast expression of multi-subunit neuronal receptors.

Research and career 
Jansen was fascinated by the development of novel pharmaceuticals, and wanted to return to Europe, so moved to Geneva to join the Glaxo Institute for Molecular Biology. At the Glaxo Institute for Molecular Biology Jansen encouraged the immunologists to create a novel receptor for immunoglobulin E. She completed an internship in the laboratory of David Bishop at the University of Oxford, where she studied the expression of insect cells using baculoviridae.

In 1992 Jansen moved back to the United States, where she joined the vaccine division at Merck & Co. She became interested in making vaccines, and started work on the human papillomavirus infection. Soon after Jian Zhou and Ian Frazer started work on the HPV vaccine, proposing that the proteins of the human papillomavirus infection virus-like particles could be self assembled into something that could be used as a vaccine. Jansen proposed the vaccine should be made in yeast, a substrate which Merck & Co. had previously used for the Hepatitis B vaccine. Various innovations were required to ensure that the yeast did not degrade the virus like particles, and prevent their aggregation. Jansen managed to convince Edward Scolnick that the experimental vaccine was worth pursuing, and started to make the assays. Jansen worked with Laura Koutsky at the University of Washington to conduct natural history studies that informed the phase 2 clinical trials. In 2002 the vaccination was proven 100% effective, and Jansen left the Merck & Co. knowing that the vaccination would be a success.

She joined VaxGen in 2004, where she was appointed chief scientific officer. In 2006 Jansen left VaxGen to join Wyeth Pharmaceuticals in 2006, where she was responsible for vaccine discovery. Here she developed the pneumococcal conjugate vaccine (Prevnar-13). In 2010 Jansen was appointed adjunct professor at the University of Pennsylvania.

Jansen is concerned about the rise of vaccine hesitancy. During a conference at Pfizer in 2019, she said “I don't know what motivates an individual to ignore scientific facts. As scientists, it is our obligation to rectify misinformation and to provide the facts on what we know and what we don't know,”.

During the COVID-19 pandemic Jansen oversaw the development of the Pfizer COVID-19 vaccine. She looked at four potential candidates, before joining with BioNTech to improve the likelihood of identifying the vaccine with the highest potential. To test efficacy, Jansen and Pfizer are working under guidance from the Food and Drug Administration and conducting a 30,000 patient study. In July 2020 Jansen announced positive results in their clinical trials, resulting in an increase in the share price of Pfizer.

Select publications

References 

1958 births
Living people
University of Marburg alumni
Vaccinologists
Microbiologists
COVID-19 researchers
Pfizer people
Wyeth
University of Pennsylvania faculty
GSK plc people
Merck & Co. people
German immunologists
Foreign associates of the National Academy of Engineering
Members of the National Academy of Medicine